The 19th TCA Awards were presented by the Television Critics Association. Wanda Sykes hosted the ceremony on July 19, 2003 at the Renaissance Hollywood Hotel.

Winners and nominees

Multiple wins 
The following shows received multiple wins:

Multiple nominations 
The following shows received multiple nominations:

References

External links 
 Official website 
 2003 TCA Awards at IMDb.com

2003 television awards
2003 in American television
TCA Awards ceremonies